Teresa Maria Manetti (3 March 1846 – 23 April 1910), born Teresa Adelaide Cesina Manetti, was an Italian Roman Catholic religious sister and was the founder of the Carmelite Sisters of Saint Teresa. She took the religious name Teresa Maria of the Cross when she became a member of the Third Order of Our Lady of Mount Carmel.

Teresa Maria of the Cross was beatified in 1986 after the recognition of a miracle attributed to her.

Life
Teresa Maria Manetti was born on 3 March 1846 in Campi Bisenzio as the daughter of Salvatore Manetti and Rosa Bigagli. Her brother was Adamo Raffaello. Teresa Maria lived her life in a small village outside of Florence and her father died when she was three. She received her First Communion on 8 May 1859.

At the age of eighteen - at the time that she suddenly realized what her vocation was - Teresa Maria gathered a group of women who were all teachers; the group soon became exposed to the writings of the Carmelite Teresa of Avila, and soon enough a devotion to her grew. On 16 July 1876 Teresa Maria joined a group of Carmelite tertiaries, which she joined on 12 July 1888. 

Following this, Teresa Maria of the Cross started to establish schools in cities surrounding Florence, each with its own Carmelite teachers. The congregation that she founded received approval from Pope Pius X on 27 February 1904 as the Carmelite Sisters of Saint Teresa. Their mission was to teach children, with an emphasis on orphans. Houses eventually opened in Syria and Palestine after the approval was granted.

Teresa Maria of the Cross contracted a grave illness in 1908 which intensified until she died on 23 April 1910. Her relics were relocated on 22 April 1912.

Beatification
The cause for beatification commenced in Florence in the 1930s despite the formal opening of the cause under Pope Pius XII on 30 July 1944. Pope Paul VI approved the findings of the Congregation for the Causes of Saints and approved the fact that she had lived a life of heroic virtue. As a result, on 23 May 1975, he declared her to be Venerable.

Pope John Paul II approved a miracle attributed to her intercession on 16 November 1985 and beatified her on 19 October 1986.

References

External links
Hagiography Circle
Saints SQPN
Carmelite Sisters of Saint Teresa

1846 births
1910 deaths
People from Campi Bisenzio
Grand Duchy of Tuscany people
Founders of Catholic religious communities
19th-century venerated Christians
20th-century venerated Christians
Venerated Carmelites
Italian beatified people
Beatifications by Pope John Paul II